Danilinho is the name of:

Danilinho (footballer, born 1985), Brazilian footballer
Danilinho (footballer, born 1987), Brazilian footballer